This is a list of 122 species in Minettia, a genus of flies in the family Lauxaniidae.

Minettia species

 Minettia aberrans (Malloch, 1925) c g
 Minettia acuminata Sasakawa, 1985 c g
 Minettia albibasis Malloch, 1933 c g
 Minettia albomarginata Malloch, 1933 c g
 Minettia albonito Curran, 1926 c g
 Minettia americanella Shewell, 1938 i c g
 Minettia andalusiaca (Strobl, 1899) c g
 Minettia argentiventris Malloch, 1928 c g
 Minettia assimilis Malloch, 1926 c g
 Minettia atrata (Meijere, 1910) c g
 Minettia atratula (Meijere, 1924) c g
 Minettia austriaca Hennig, 1951 c g
 Minettia biseriata (Loew, 1847) c g
 Minettia buchanani Malloch, 1924 i c g
 Minettia bulgarica Papp, 1981 c g
 Minettia caesia (Coquillett, 1904) i c g b
 Minettia cana Melander, 1913 i c g
 Minettia cantolraensis Carles-Tolra, 1998 c g
 Minettia caucasica Shatalkin, 1998 c g
 Minettia centralis Malloch, 1933 c g
 Minettia chilensis (Schiner, 1868) c g
 Minettia coracina Shatalkin, 1993 c g
 Minettia crassulata Shatalkin, 1998 c g
 Minettia cypriota Papp, 1981 c g
 Minettia czernyi Freidberg, 1990 c g
 Minettia dedecor (Loew, 1873) c g
 Minettia desmometopa (de Meijere, 1907) g
 Minettia dichroa Malloch, 1933 c g
 Minettia dissimilis Collin, 1966 c g
 Minettia divaricata Sasakawa, 1985 c g
 Minettia duplicata (Lynch Arribalzaga, 1893) c g
 Minettia elbergi Shatalkin, 1996 c g
 Minettia eoa Shatalkin, 1992 c g
 Minettia evittata Malloch, 1926 c g
 Minettia fasciata (Fallén, 1826 ) c g b
 Minettia filia (Becker, 1895) c g
 Minettia filippovi Shatalkin, 1998 c g
 Minettia flaveola (Coquillett, 1898) i c g b
 Minettia flavipalpis (Loew, 1847) c g
 Minettia flaviventris (Costa, 1844) c g
 Minettia fulvicornis Malloch, 1933 c g
 Minettia fumipennis Melander, 1913 i c g
 Minettia fuscescens Shatalkin, 1998 c g
 Minettia fuscofasciata (Meijere, 1910) c g
 Minettia galil Freidberg, 1991 c g
 Minettia gemina Shatalkin, 1992 c g
 Minettia gemmata Shatalkin, 1992 c g
 Minettia glauca (Coquillett, 1902) i c g
 Minettia graeca Papp, 1981 c g
 Minettia helva Czerny, 1932 c g
 Minettia helvola (Becker, 1895) c g
 Minettia hoozanensis Malloch, 1927 g
 Minettia hoozanesis Malloch, 1927 c g
 Minettia hubbardii (Coquillett, 1898) i c g
 Minettia hyrcanica Shatalkin, 1999 c g
 Minettia ignobilis Malloch, 1933 c g
 Minettia imparispinosa Sasakawa, 2001 c g
 Minettia infraseta Malloch, 1933 c g
 Minettia infuscata Malloch, 1928 c g
 Minettia inusta (Meigen, 1826) c g
 Minettia japonica Sasakawa, 1995 c g
 Minettia kimi Sasakawa & Kozanek, 1995 c g
 Minettia kunashirica Shatalkin, 1992 c g
 Minettia linguifera Sasakawa & Kozanek, 1995 c g
 Minettia lobata Shewell, 1938 i c g b
 Minettia loewi (Schiner, 1864) g
 Minettia longipennis (Fabricius, 1794) c g
 Minettia longiseta (Loew, 1847) c g
 Minettia longistylis Sasakawa, 2002 c g
 Minettia lupulina (Fabricius, 1787) i c g b
 Minettia luteitarsis (Meijere, 1916) c g
 Minettia lyraformis Shewell, 1938 i c g
 Minettia maculithorax (Malloch, 1926) c g
 Minettia magna (Coquillett, 1898) i c g b
 Minettia martineki Ceianu, 1991 c g
 Minettia maura (Walker, 1853) c g
 Minettia mona Curran, 1926 c g
 Minettia multisetosa (Kertesz, 1915) c g
 Minettia muricata (Becker, 1895) c g
 Minettia nigritarsis Shatalkin, 1998 c g
 Minettia nigriventris (Czerny, 1932) c g
 Minettia nigrohalterata Malloch, 1927 c g
 Minettia nigropunctata Malloch, 1928 c g
 Minettia nitidiventris Malloch, 1935 c g
 Minettia obscura (Loew, 1861) i c g
 Minettia obscurata Shewell, 1977 c g
 Minettia omei Shatalkin, 1998 c g
 Minettia palaestinensis Papp, 1981 c g
 Minettia philippinensis Malloch, 1929 c g
 Minettia pirioni Malloch, 1933 c g
 Minettia plumicheta (Rondani, 1868) c g
 Minettia plumicornis (Fallen, 1820) c g
 Minettia punctata Sasakawa, 1985 c g
 Minettia punctiventris (Rondani, 1868) c g
 Minettia quadrisetosa (Becker, 1907) c g
 Minettia quadrispinosa Malloch, 1927 c g
 Minettia rivosa (Meigen, 1826) i
 Minettia rufiventris (Macquart, 1848) c
 Minettia ryukyuensis Sasakawa, 2002 c g
 Minettia sasakawai Shi, Wang & Yang, 2011 g
 Minettia sbitinctiventris Papp, 1981 c g
 Minettia semifulva Malloch, 1933 c g
 Minettia seminigra Malloch, 1933 c g
 Minettia shewelli Steyskal, 1971 i c g b
 Minettia styriaca (Strobl, 1892) c g
 Minettia subtinctiventris Papp, 1981 c g
 Minettia subvittata (Loew, 1847) c g
 Minettia suillorum (Robineau-Desvoidy, 1830) c g
 Minettia tabidiventris (Papp, 1877) c g
 Minettia tarsata Sasakawa & Kozanek, 1995 c g
 Minettia tenebrica Shatalkin, 1992 c g
 Minettia tetrachaeta (Loew, 1873) c g
 Minettia thomsoni (Lynch Arribalzaga, 1893) c g
 Minettia tinctiventris (Rondani, 1868) c g
 Minettia tubifer (Meigen, 1826) c g
 Minettia tubifera Malloch, 1927 c g
 Minettia tucumanensis Malloch, 1928 c g
 Minettia tunisica Papp, 1981 c g
 Minettia univittata (Coquillett, 1904) i c g
 Minettia verticalis Malloch, 1928 c g
 Minettia vockerothi Sasakawa, 1998 c g
 Minettia zuercheri (Hendel, 1933) c g

Data sources: i = ITIS, c = Catalogue of Life, g = GBIF, b = Bugguide.net

References

Minettia